Thomas Powys may refer to:

 Thomas Powys (judge) (1649–1719), MP and Attorney General to King James II
 Thomas Powys (priest) (1747–1809), Anglican clergyman
 Thomas Powys, 1st Baron Lilford (1743–1800), British politician
 Thomas Powys, 2nd Baron Lilford (1775–1825), British peer
 Thomas Powys, 3rd Baron Lilford (1801–1861), British peer and politician
 Thomas Powys, 4th Baron Lilford (1833–1896), British aristocrat and ornithologist

See also
 Powys Thomas (1926–1977), British-born actor in Canada